Veliko Selo   is a village in the municipality of Malo Crniće, Serbia. According to the 2002 census, the village has a population of 493 people (according to the 1991 census, the village had a population of 694 people) .

References

Populated places in Braničevo District